The 2021–22 NWFL Premiership is the 32nd season of the NWFL Premiership, Nigeria's top-flight women's association football league and the second season since its rebranding. The season commenced on 8 December 2021 and will end in May 2022.

This season saw a return to the abridged format whereby the fourteen clubs are divided into two groups of seven teams each whereafter a "Super Six" tournament will decide the league champions. Defending champions Rivers Angels finished third at the Championship play-offs. 

Bayelsa Queens won their 5th NWFL Premiership title after emerging champions of the Super Six tournament.

Clubs
Naija Ratels and Adamawa Queens were promoted to the top-flight after winning the NWFL Championship play-offs; the latter having failed to compete the previous season due to late licensing and registration. They replaced DreamStar Ladies and Ibom Angels who were relegated after finishing bottom of the group at the previous season's relegation playoffs.

Regular season

Group A

Results

Group B

Results

Play-offs

Championship playoffs
The top six teams at the end of the regular season engaged each other in a round-robin playoff also known as the Super Six between 16 to 22 May in order to decide the league champion and representative at the 2023 CAF Women's Champions League. All matches are played at the Samuel Ogbemudia Stadium and UNIBEN Sports Complex in Benin City.

Statistical leaders

Hat-tricks

Season's awards

References

External links
 
NWFL Premiership 2021/22 at RSSF

NWFL Premiership seasons
N
Women